Card Switch is an unincorporated community in Jackson County, Alabama, United States.

A CSX railway line runs through Card Switch.

The Burch Cemetery is located in Card Switch.  Also located there is the Morning Star Missionary Baptist Church.  Elias Camp Morris, who went on the become president of the National Baptist Convention in 1895, joined the church in 1874 and was licensed to preach the following year.

References

Unincorporated communities in Jackson County, Alabama
Unincorporated communities in Alabama